The blue green shan shui, is a Chinese painting style of "shan shui". It tends to refer to an "ancient style" rather than modern ones. The main colours of the paintings are blues and greens, and in the early period it was painted using mineral dyes. This style was first formulated by Li Sixun, a general, politician and famous painter in Tang Dynasty.

History and sub styles

Similar styles appeared before the Tang Dynasty, especially in the period of the Six Dynasties. Many historic records show that Li father and sons – Li Sixun (father) and Li Zhaodao (son, son of Li Sixun), largely developed the painting techniques and formulated the style.

There are mainly two styles of this painting:
 Shibi Qingyuan
 Yibi Qingyuan

Schools
Tang Dynasty:
 General blue-green shan shui.
Late Northern Song Dynasty:
 Bright green shan shui
 Great blue-green shan shui
 Little blue-green shan shui
Yuan Dynasty, Ming Dynasty and Qing Dynasty:
 The little blue-green shan shui is the dominant style/school. Especially in the Late Ming Dynasty, the painter Lan Ying (Chinese: 蓝瑛; Pinyin: Lán Yīng) from Zhe School (Chinese: 浙派) developed the style to an historic climax.

See also
 Chinese painting
 Shan shui

References

Chinese painting